Parliamentary elections were held in Senegal on 31 July 2022.

Electoral system 
The 165 members of the National Assembly are elected by two methods; 112 are elected by either first-past-the-post or party bloc vote in 54 single- or multi-member constituencies based on the 46 departments, with an additional 15 elected by overseas voters. The other 53 seats are elected from a nationwide constituency by proportional representation, with seats allocated initially using the simple quotient, with remaining seats allocated using the largest remainder method.

Campaign
Ousmane Sonko was disqualified as a candidate by the Constitutional Council. As a result of his arrest due to rape charges, leading to violent protests. Alongside Sonko, Khalifa Sall and Karim Wade were disqualified as candidates.

Aminata Touré of the APR called on Senegalese youth to vote for her party, citing Macky Sall's work for the country.

Results
Polls opened at 8:00 GMT and closed at 18:00 GMT. Partial results were expected to be announced on 31 July, with the provisional overall results to be announced on 5 August.

Aftermath
Both the Alliance for the Republic and the opposition Wallu Sénégal alongside Yewwi Askan Wi claimed victory on election night. Aminata Touré declared that the APR had won 30 of the country's 46 departments, giving them an "unquestionable majority" without stating the number of seats won by the party. Barthélémy Dias, mayor of Dakar and member of Yewwi Askan Wi immediately disputed Touré's claims, stating "You lost this election at the national level. We will not accept it. This abuse will not pass". However on 11 August both main opposition coalitions announced that they would not appeal the results, but would keep opposing Macky Sall from inside the National Assembly. Despite none of the coalitions obtaining a majority of the seats, an agreement over the formation of a new government was reached when Bokk Gis Gis' only elected member, Pape Diop, decided to support Macky Sall, giving the presidential block a one-seat majority. However, on 25 September Aminata Touré announced she would no longer sit with BBY in the Assembly, accusing President Sall of promoting Amadou Mame Diop as president of the National Assembly due to "familial ties", resulting in the government losing its majority in the chamber.

References

Elections in Senegal
2022 in Senegal
Senegal
Senegal